Basain is a 1957 Nepali novel written by Lil Bahadur Chettri. It was published by Sajha Prakashan and is included in the curriculum of Tribhuvan University. Chettri, an Assamese Nepali writer wrote this book incorporating the experience of different Nepalese immigrants in India. The book depicts life of a poor farmer and his family in a rural village in hilly Nepal and the circumstances under which they are forced to emigrate away from their village.

Synopsis 
The book is set in a nameless hilly village in Eastern Nepal. Dhan Bahadur Basnet is a poor farmer living with his wife, sister and a son. The book shows his struggle in the village and how he is deceived by others. The book shows the circumstances under which poor Nepali people have to migrate from their home to places in India for employment. The caste and gender discrimination, poverty, and injustice are the major theme in this book. The book shows how rich people suppress poor people and further push theme towards poverty instead of uplifting them.

Characters 

 Dhan Bahadur Basnet 'Dhane', the main protagonist of the book is a poor farmer in rural Nepal
 Jhumavati Basnet, Dhane's younger sister
 Maina, Dhane's wife
 Dhane and Maina's infant child
 Budho baidar, a moneylender
 Rikute, an Indian Gorkha recruit from the neighbouring village
 Thuli, Jhuma's friend
 Mukhiya, the village head
 Mote Karki, Dhane's helpful friend
 Leute Damai, a villager from Dhane's village
 Nande Dhakal, a villager
 Luintel, a rich landlord
 Sane Gharti, Luintel's servant
 Budhe Kami, a villager

Adaptation and translation 
The novel was adapted into a Nepali movie by Subash Gajurel in 2003. The movie was Nepal's official entry to the Academy Award for Best International Feature Film, however the film was not nominated.

The novel was translation into English as Mountains Painted With Turmeric by Michael Hutt.

See also 

 Alikhit
 Shirishko Phool
 Radha

References 

1957 books
20th-century Nepalese literature
20th-century Nepalese novels
Nepalese books
Nepalese fiction
Nepalese novels
Nepali-language novels
1957 Nepalese novels
Novels set in Nepal
Novels set in the 20th century
Nepalese novels adapted into films